Hands Down is the tenth studio album by Bob James), released in 1982. This was a turning point in James career, with the tracks "It's Only Me" and "Spunky" being early exponents of electronic jazz. At the time electronica was transforming popular music in reaction to the big orchestrations of the late 1970s (prevalent on James' previous works). The minimalist tastes of the era were also reflected in "Roberta", which mostly featured James in a piano solo.

The track "Shamboozie" is sampled by rapper Rakim on the track "Guess Who's Back" from his 1997 album The 18th Letter.

Track listing 
All songs written by Bob James, unless where noted.
 "Spunky" - 6:59
 "Macumba" (Rod Temperton, Bob James) - 5:11
 "Shamboozie" - 5:17
 "Janus" - 5:51
 "Roberta" (Mike Lawrence) - 6:53
 "It's Only Me" - 5:24

Personnel 
 Bob James – Fender Rhodes (1, 2, 3), synthesizers (1-4, 6), synth bass (2, 6), drum programming (2, 6), acoustic piano (4, 5, 6)
 Steve Khan – guitar (2, 3)
 David Brown – guitar (4)
 Gary King – bass (1, 2, 5)
 Marcus Miller – bass (3)
 Doug Stegmeyer – bass (4)
 Harvey Mason – drums (1, 5)
 John Robinson – drums (2, 3)
 Liberty DeVitto – drums (4)
 Leonard 'Doc' Gibbs, Jr. – percussion (1-4)

Brass and Woodwinds
 Rob Zante – lyricon (2)
 Jay Beckenstein – alto saxophone (3)
 Eddie Daniels – woodwinds (2, 3, 5), tenor saxophone (4)
 George Marge – woodwinds (2, 3, 5)
 Wally Kane – woodwinds (2, 3)
 Whit Sidener – woodwinds (2, 3)
 Mark Colby – woodwinds (5)
 Jim Pugh – trombone (2, 3, 5)
 Dave Taylor – trombone (2, 3, 5)
 Wayne Andre – trombone (5)
 Jon Faddis – trumpet (2, 3, 5)
 Mike Lawrence – trumpet (2, 3)
 Ron Tooley – trumpet (2, 3)
 Randy Brecker – trumpet (5)
 John Frosk – trumpet (5)
 Marvin Stamm – trumpet (5)

Strings on "Roberta"
 David Nadien – concertmaster 
 Jonathan Abramowitz, Warren Lash, Richard Locker and Charles McCracken – cello 
 Lamar Alsop, Alfred Brown and Emanuel Vardi – viola 
 Elena Barer, Lewis Eley, Max Ellen, Barry Finclair, Theodore Israel, Marvin Morgenstern, Jan Mullen, John Pintavalle, Matthew Raimondi, Joseph Rubushka, Richard Sortomme and Gerald Tarack – violin

Vocals on "Macumba"
 Patti Austin, Vivian Cherry, Milt Grayson, Yvonne Lewis, Zach Sanders and Luther Vandross
 Rod Temperton – vocal arrangements

Production 
 Bob James – producer, arrangements
 Joe Jorgensen – co-producer, recording, mixing 
 Nancy Byers – assistant engineer
 Mark Chusid – assistant engineer
 Chaz Clifton – assistant engineer
 Bruce Robbins – assistant engineer
 Wayne Warnecke – assistant engineer
 Vlado Meller – mastering 
 Marion Orr – production coordinator
 Paula Scher – art direction, design 
 Michael Tannen & Associates – management 
Studios 
 Recorded at A&R Recording, CBS Studios and Mediasound (New York City, New York); Minot Sound (White Plains, New York).
 Mixed at Minot Sound
 Mastered at CBS Studios

Bob James (musician) albums
1982 albums
Albums produced by Bob James (musician)